Christopher Alexander Rockins (born May 18, 1962) is a former American football safety in the National Football League. He was drafted by the Cleveland Browns in the second round of the 1984 NFL Draft. He played college football at Oklahoma State.

1962 births
Living people
American football safeties
People from Sherman, Texas
Players of American football from Texas
Oklahoma State Cowboys football players
Cleveland Browns players